Happiness is a studio album by the rock band Fridge. It was released in 2001 on Text Records.

Track listing

 "Melodica and Trombone"
 "Drum Machines and Glockenspiel"
 "Cut Up Piano and Xylophone"
 "Tone Guitar and Drum Noise"
 "Five Four Child Voice"
 "Sample and Clicks"
 "Drums Bass Sonics and Edits"
 "Harmonics"
 "Long Singing"
 "Surface Noise and Electric Piano" [Japanese version only]
 "Five Combs" [Japanese version only]

References

2001 albums
Fridge (band) albums
Text Records albums